Manoel Odir Rocha (12 February 1941 – 4 May 2022) was a Brazilian politician. A member of the Reform Progressive Party, he served as mayor of Palmas from 1997 to 2000 and briefly served in the Chamber of Deputies from February to March 1995. He died in Palmas on 4 May 2022 at the age of 81.

References 

1941 births
2022 deaths
Mayors of places in Brazil
Members of the Chamber of Deputies (Brazil) from Tocantins
National Renewal Alliance politicians
Brazilian public health doctors
20th-century Brazilian politicians
People from Minas Gerais